Christopher Alesund (born 29 May 1990), better known as GeT_RiGhT, is a Swedish Counter-Strike player who is currently a streamer for Dignitas. During his time as a member of Ninjas in Pyjamas, he was considered one of the best Counter-Strike players in the history of the series. He began playing competitively in 2007 and has previously been a member of SK Gaming, Fnatic, Begrip Gaming, Ninjas in Pyjamas and Dignitas.

Career

Counter-Strike
Christopher Alesund started playing 1.6 after his brother Robin introduced him to the game. In 2007, Alesund started playing for Begrip, placed 2nd at spiXelania 2007. Later that year, he joined SK Gaming, which placed 4th at the EM II Finals on March 9, 2008.

In early 2009, Alesund joined Fnatic, replacing Oskar "ins" Holm.  This proved to be a good move, as the team won the WEG e-Stars 2009: King of the Game soon after. In March, Alesund won his first major, IEM Season III against the Polish super team MeetYourMakers.  They then won KODE5 2009, WEG e-Stars 2009, IEM IV Dubai, and placed 2nd at IEM IV Chengdu. Alesund also won the European Nations Championship, representing the Swedish national team.  They had second-place finish at World Cyber Games 2009, this time losing to the same Polish team of AGAiN.  In December, they topped off the 2009 season with a victory at World e-Sports Masters 2009.  Fnatic's 2009, had been the most successful for the organisation at the time.  Alesund was then named e-Sports Player of the Year and Counter-Strike Player of the Year.  In 2010, Fnatic weren't as successful, but continued to perform well, getting 2nd at the IEM IV European Championships, and IEM IV at the start of the year.  After a very successful individual year, Alesund placed 2nd on HLTV's top 20 of 2010.

In 2011, Alesund started a third stint at SK Gaming, and was joined by Fnatic teammates Patrik "f0rest" Lindberg and Rasmus "Gux" Ståhl.  After a few minor results, SK won DreamHack Summer 2011, with Alesund being selected as the MVP.  SK continued to have some success, winning IEM6 6C New York and a Counter-Strike Major, ESWC 2011. Once again, Alesund was placed #2 on HLTV top's 20, this time for 2011.

Counter-Strike: Global Offensive
In July 2012, in anticipation of switching Counter-Strike versions to Counter-Strike: Global Offensive, he left SK Gaming and joined Ninjas in Pyjamas (NiP). Alesund was an integral part of this dominant NiP team that went 87 matches without a loss. NiP won the ESL Major Series One 2013 spring tournament, defeating Fnatic 2–0. NiP and Alesund finished tied for 5th-8th at ESWC 2015. The next month, NiP finished 5th at ESL One Cologne 2015.

Alesund is widely considered to be one of the greatest Counter-Strike players of all time in both versions of the game. While never considered the best at aiming in the series, he is well known for his highly consistent play, success in clutch and high-pressure situations, and for popularizing the "lurker" role among teams. HLTV.org rated him as the best player in both 2013 and 2014 in their end-of-year rankings due to his high level of play in tournament finals and other important games.

In 2019, Alesund was reportedly set to be replaced after the StarLadder Major: Berlin 2019. Alesund officially stepped down from the roster late September.

On January 21, 2020, Alesund reunited with his former NiP teammates (f0rest, Xizt, Friberg and Fifflaren) in Dignitas. After a series of lackluster performances, Alesund was benched by Dignitas the following September, with the organization promising to assist with transitioning to the next phase of his career. In January 2021, Alesund announced that he was stepping away from professional competition and would become a content creator for Dignitas.

Notable tournament results 
Bold denotes a CS:GO Major

References

External links
 GeT_RiGhT on Youtube
 GeT_RiGhT on Twitch

Living people
Counter-Strike players
Swedish esports players
1990 births
SK Gaming players
Ninjas in Pyjamas players
Fnatic players
Place of birth missing (living people)
Articles with underscores in the title